The Yukubenic languages (or Oohum languages) are a branch of either the Jukunoid family or the Plateau family spoken in southeastern Nigeria. Glottolog places Yukubenic in the Plateau family. Ethnologue, however, places Yukubenic in the Jukunoid family, based on Shimizu (1980), and Blench also follows this classification.

Classification 
The Yukubenic languages are:

Bete, Lufu
Kapya
Afudu
Akum, Beezen–Baazem
Yukuben (Uuhum Gigi)

Names and locations
Below is a list of language names, populations, and locations from Blench (2019).

References

 
Plateau languages